Perttu Leppä (born 8 February 1964 in Joensuu, Finland) is a Finnish film director and screenwriter.

Career
Making film since 1992 he has written and directed films such as Helmiä ja sikoja in 2003 working with actors such as Mikko Leppilampi and Laura Birn.

Filmography

Feature films 
 A Long Hot Summer (Pitkä kuuma kesä, 1999)
 Pearls and Pigs (Helmiä ja sikoja, 2003)
 8 Days to Premiere (8 päivää ensi-iltaan, 2008)

Short films 
 For Ever and Ever (Aina ja aina, 1986)
 The Ostrich (Strutsi, 1987)
 One-One (Yksi-yksi, 1989)
 Karavaani (1994)
 Tyttöjä ja jäätelöä (1995)
 Angora (1996)

External links
 

1964 births
Living people
People from Joensuu
Finnish film directors
Finnish screenwriters